Homicide is an Australian police procedural television series which aired from 1964 to 1977 on Seven Network.

Series overview

Episodes

Season 1 (1964)

Season 2 (1965)

Season 3 (1965–66)

Season 4 (1967)

Season 5 (1968)

Season 6 (1969)

Season 7 (1970)

Season 8 (1971)

Season 9 (1972)

Season 10 (1973)

Season 11 (1974)

Season 12 (1975)

Season 13 (1976)

References

External links 
 
 

Homicide
Homicide